ချောင်းကြီးကျေးရွာသည် မန္တလေး တိုင်းဒေသကြီး

ပြင်ဦးလွင်ခရိုင် သပိတ်ကျင်းမြို့နယ်တွင်တည်ရှိသည်

Geography
The Chaunggyi valley is located about 3,5 km northeast of Letha Taung, also known as the Singu Plateau, near National Highway 31. In the valley there are Lisu (at Lezawchaunggyi), Palaung (at Palaungchaunggyi), Shan and Gurkha ethnic minorities living in separate villages.

References 

Populated places in Mandalay Region